Parkhurst Mountain is a  mountain summit located in the Garibaldi Ranges of the Coast Mountains, in northwestern Garibaldi Provincial Park of southwestern British Columbia, Canada. Parkhurst's nearest neighbor is Rethel Mountain,  to the northwest, and its nearest higher peak (and also the highest peak in Garibaldi Park) is Wedge Mountain,  to the southeast. Precipitation runoff from the peak drains into Wedge Creek, Wedgemount Creek, and Rethel Creek, which are all tributaries of the Green River, which in turn is a tributary of the Lillooet River. The site was named for Mr. and Mrs. Parkhurst who preempted the land on Green Lake in 1902 and built a small house where they lived with their family. The mountain's name was officially adopted on June 25, 1975, by the Geographical Names Board of Canada.

Climate

Based on the Köppen climate classification, Parkhurst Mountain is located in the marine west coast climate zone of western North America. Most weather fronts originate in the Pacific Ocean, and travel east toward the Coast Mountains where they are forced upward by the range (Orographic lift), causing them to drop their moisture in the form of rain or snowfall. As a result, the Coast Mountains experience high precipitation, especially during the winter months in the form of snowfall. Temperatures can drop below −20 °C with wind chill factors below −30 °C. The months July through September offer the most favorable weather for climbing Parkhurst Mountain.

See also

 Geography of British Columbia
 Geology of British Columbia

References

External links
 Weather: Parkhurst Mountain

Garibaldi Ranges
Two-thousanders of British Columbia
Sea-to-Sky Corridor
New Westminster Land District